Captain Walter Alexander Tyrrell  (23 August 1898 – 9 June 1918) was a British First World War flying ace credited with seventeen aerial victories.

Early life and background
Tyrrell was born in Belfast, one of three sons of John Tyrrell, a merchant, alderman and justice of the peace, who was the High Sheriff of Belfast in 1914, and his wife Jeanie (née Todd). The family resided at Fairview Buildings, Crumlin Road. He was educated at the Royal Belfast Academical Institution and the Belfast Municipal Technical Institute.

World War I
Tyrrell joined the Royal Navy, serving in the Royal Naval Air Service's Armoured Car Division as a petty officer from 26 December 1914 until 24 November 1915, under Commander Oliver Locker-Lampson. He spent eight months in Belgium and France, but was discharged after an accident, when an armoured car crushed his foot. He returned to Belfast where he was a member of the Queen's University Belfast Officers' Training Corps and worked as an apprentice motor engineer.

Tyrrell joined the Royal Flying Corps as an officer cadet at Farnborough on 4 April 1917, and was commissioned as a temporary second lieutenant (on probation) on 21 June. On 30 August 1917 he was appointed a flying officer and confirmed in his rank.

He was posted to No. 32 Squadron RFC to fly the Airco DH.5 single-seat fighter, and scored five victories (four shared) between 30 October and 5 December 1917. In early 1918 Tyrrell's squadron was re-equipped with the S.E.5a fighter. On 21 March the Germans launched their Spring Offensive on the Somme Front, and on 7 April Tyrrell claimed three enemy fighters shot down over Lamotte. On 10 April No. 32 Squadron RAF was assigned to operations further north over the Lys Front, where Tyrrell gained two more victories, on 11 and 12 April.

No. 32 Squadron was then tasked with flying as bomber escorts, and on 3 May Tyrrell drove down two Fokker Dr.I's over Frelinghien, and forced down and captured an LVG reconnaissance aircraft near Poperinghe. Early on 8 May the squadron encountered a large formation of Pfalz D.III fighters, shooting down six, of which Tyrrell claimed one. On 18 May 1918 Tyrrell was appointed a flight commander with the temporary rank of captain, and commanded "B" flight.

On 29 May, following a request from the French for air reinforcements, No. 32 Squadron moved south to Fouquerolles. Early on 6 June Tyrrell and Lieutenant J. W. Trusler shared in sending a Pfalz D.III down in flames, and later the same day Tyrrell accounted for two Fokker D.VII fighters, bringing his total to seventeen, making him the highest scoring ace in his squadron, and the fourth highest Irish-born ace.

On 9 June the Germans launched their offensive along the Matz River, and No. 32 Squadron was engaged in ground attack missions. During one of these Tyrrell was killed when his aircraft was shot down by anti-aircraft fire. He is buried in the Communal Cemetery at Beauvais.

On 20 June 1918, only 11 days later, his older brother John Marcus Tyrrell, of the Royal Irish Fusiliers, attached Royal Air Force, was also killed in action. Both men are commemorated on the Queen's University War Memorial in Belfast, and on the Bangor War Memorial, County Down. The settlement of the two brothers' estates prompted a question in Parliament. His oldest brother William Tyrrell (RAF officer) was a rugby player and also served as an army doctor, becoming highly decorated with the Distinguished Service Order and Bar, the Military Cross and the Belgian Croix de Guerre. He would later join the same service in 1920 in which his two brothers were killed in action, and served through the Second World War.

Awards and citation
Tyrrell's award of the Military Cross was gazetted posthumously on 13 September 1918. His citation read:
Temporary Second Lieutenant Walter Alexander Tyrrell, General List, attached Royal Air Force.
"For conspicuous gallantry and devotion to duty. On one day this officer attacked two enemy triplanes, destroying one and driving down the other out of control. After this he was attacked by two other machines, one of which he forced to land, taking the occupants prisoners. On various other occasions he has destroyed or driven down out of control enemy machines."

List of aerial victories

Notes

References

1898 births
1918 deaths
Military personnel from Belfast
People educated at the Royal Belfast Academical Institution
Royal Naval Air Service personnel of World War I
Royal Flying Corps officers
Royal Air Force personnel of World War I
British World War I flying aces
Recipients of the Military Cross
Aviators killed by being shot down
British military personnel killed in World War I